Keeper Of The Flame is the fourth full-length album created by The Hiatus. It was released on March 26, 2014. Keeper Of The Flame reached No. 8 on the Oricon chart.

Track listing

References 

2014 albums
The Hiatus albums